= Vittorio Santoianni =

- Born: Italy
- Known for: contemporary painter;
- Movement: Empathism

Vittorio Santoianni was professor of Decoration at Accademia di Belle Arti di Firenze. He participated in Biennale di Venezia. Since the mid-1990s he has worked mainly in the field of historical research and criticism, where he had numerous publications on twentieth-century and contemporary architects and artists. He has curated various exhibitions.
